Romanos is a village and a community in the municipality Pylos-Nestoras, Messenia, Greece. It is part of the Nestoras municipal unit. The community consists of the villages Romanos and Petrochori. Petrochori is famous because of the Voidokilia beach. Also, near the village there is Nestor's cave.

External links
 Voidokilia.com: the WebSite of Pylos-Voidokilia Area
 Voidakothia beach looking towards Nestors Castle and path to Nestors Cave
 Voidokilia beach photo on TrekEarth

Populated places in Messenia